360 Architecture was an American architectural practice acquired by HOK in 2015. The firm provided services for a range of project types including corporate headquarters and commercial office buildings, sports arenas, stadiums and ballparks, municipal facilities, single- and multi-family residential, and mixed-use entertainment districts. The firm was headquartered in Kansas City, Missouri, with offices in Columbus Ohio; and San Francisco, California. , the firm had a staff of 200 professionals.

In January 2015, HOK completed its acquisition of 360 Architecture for an undisclosed price and announced the launch of a new global Sports + Recreation + Entertainment practice. Brad Schrock, a 360 Architecture co-founder and a director of this new HOK practice, said the acquisition would help the firms compete at the highest level.

History
CDFM2 Architecture Inc. and Heinlein Schrock Stearns merged in 2004 to form 360 Architecture. At the time, CDFM2 was a firm of sixty architects, interior architects, interior designers, 3D illustrators and graphic designers working in the corporate, developer service, government and higher education markets. Heinlein Schrock Stearns was a firm of thirty-six architects and designers focused on collegiate, minor- and major-league sports and commercial, residential and retail/entertainment projects. The merger combined thirty-four years of firm experience into 360 Architecture (CDFM2 founded in 1980 and Heinlein Schrock Stearns founded in 1995).

Recent activities
The firm worked on some of the largest sporting venues in the U.S., such as Avaya Stadium, home of the San Jose Earthquakes professional soccer team in San Jose, California, Husky Stadium in Seattle, Washington, home of the Washington Huskies football team, and MetLife Stadium in East Rutherford, New Jersey, home of the New York Giants and the New York Jets professional football teams. 360 Architecture was also a member of the Kansas City Downtown Arena Design Team (DADT). The DADT is the architect of record for the Sprint Center in downtown Kansas City.

360 Architecture is the designer for the thirteen-block revitalization project of downtown Kansas City.  Other 360 Architecture projects in the downtown Kansas City area include the J.E. Dunn Construction Company corporate headquarters, the U.S. Internal Revenue Service Center and post office renovation, H&R Block world headquarters, and the Boulevard Brewing Company expansion.

Selected projects

 TBD: New Downtown Tucson Arena
 TBD: Oakland Ballpark (home of Oakland Athletics)
 2017: Little Caesars Arena (home of Detroit Red Wings and Detroit Pistons)
 2017: Mercedes Benz Stadium (home of Atlanta Falcons and Atlanta United FC)
 2016: Rogers Place (home of Edmonton Oilers)
 2015: Avaya Stadium (home of San Jose Earthquakes)
 2013: Auburn University Recreation & Wellness Center
 2013: Husky Stadium (home of Washington Huskies)
 2013: Polsinelli Headquarters Kansas City, Missouri
 2013: AMC Theatres Theatre Support Center in Leawood, Kansas
 2010: New Meadowlands Stadium (home of New York Giants and New York Jets)
 2010: Banterra Center renovation at Southern Illinois University
 2010: Saluki Stadium at Southern Illinois University
 2010: Auburn University's New Auburn Arena
 2009: JE Dunn Construction Company headquarters
 2009: Huntington Park (Columbus, Ohio)
 2008: Kansas City Power & Light District
 2008: Church of the Nazarene Global Ministry Center
 2008: BB&T Arena at Northern Kentucky University (originally The Bank of Kentucky Center)
 2007: Sprint Center
 2007: Bright House Networks Stadium
 2007: Rent One Park
 2006: H&R Block world headquarters
 2006: Boulevard Brewing Company
 2006: Miami University's Steve Cady Arena at the Goggin Ice Center
 2006: University of Nebraska-Lincoln's Memorial Stadium renovation
 2006:  Nara Restaurant
 2005: Stockton Arena
 2005: University of Kansas Hall Center for the Humanities
 2004: Kansas City International Airport terminals renovation
 2004: Mizzou Arena
 2004: Bernstein-Rein headquarters renovation
 2004: Navy–Marine Corps Memorial Stadium renovation
 2003: CommunityAmerica Ballpark
 2003: Gaylord Family Oklahoma Memorial Stadium
 2002: University of Dayton Arena
 2002: Veterans Memorial Stadium (Cedar Rapids)
 2001: Kansas City Southern headquarters - Cathedral Square
 2000: Nationwide Arena
 2000: Lockton Companies headquarters 
 1999: American Airlines Arena
 1999: Safeco Field
 1998: Kohl Center
 1996: DST Systems headquarters
 1994: Kansas City Downtown Airport renovation
 1992: American Cancer Society headquarters

Markets served

 mixed use
 corporate
 civic
 sports (collegiate & professional)
 recreation
 residential
 hospitality
 higher education

Services

 landscape architecture
 visioning and strategic planning
 master planning
 building and site evaluation
 code and Americans with Disabilities Act of 1990 (ADA) analysis
 programming
 spatial planning
 workstation standards
 furniture evaluation
 architectural design
 interior design
 facility management
 construction documentation
 construction administration
 change management
 move management
 graphics and signage
 3D illustration and animation
 specification and administration

References

External links
 360architects.com , official website
 Kansas City Area Development Council Profile on 360 Architecture

Architecture firms based in Missouri
Companies based in Kansas City, Missouri
American companies established in 2004